Malika-i-Jahan ("Queen of the World") was a title bestowed upon the chief consort of Muslim rulers of South Asia. It may refer to:

 Malika-i-Jahan (Alauddin Khalji) (13th-14th century) of Delhi Sultanate
 Malika Jahan (16th century), wife of the Mughal emperor Jahangir
 Malekeh Jahan (1875–1947), was the queen consort and cousin of Mohammad Ali Shah, Qajar
 Mumtaz Mahal (1593-1631), queen of the Mughal emperor Shah Jahan
 Sahiba Mahal (died c. 1793), wife of the Mughal emperor Muhammad Shah